This is a list of the squads picked for the men's 2009 ICC World Twenty20. This was the second ICC World Twenty20 tournament and was held between 5 and 21 June 2009.

Australia
Australia named their 15-man squad on 5 May 2009. On 4 June 2009 Andrew Symonds was dropped from the team and replaced by Cameron White.

Coach: Tim Nielsen

Bangladesh
Bangladesh named their 15-man squad on 4 May 2009.

Coach: Jamie Siddons

England
England named their 15-man squad on 1 May 2009.

Coach: Andy Flower

India
India named their 15-man squad on 4 May 2009. On 9 June 2009, the injured Virender Sehwag was replaced by Dinesh Karthik.

Coach: Gary Kirsten

Ireland

Coach: Phil Simmons

Netherlands

Coach: Peter Drinnen

New Zealand
New Zealand named their 15-man squad on 7 April 2009. On 11 June 2009, Aaron Redmond was called up to cover for the injured Jesse Ryder.

Coach: Andy Moles

Pakistan
Pakistan named their 15-man squad on 4 May 2009. On 21 May 2009, Shoaib Akhtar was withdrawn and replaced by Rao Iftikhar Anjum. During the tournament, Abdul Razzaq was called up to replace the injured Yasir Arafat on 10 June 2009.

Coach: Intikhab Alam

South Africa
South Africa named their 15-man squad on 4 May 2009.

Coach: Mickey Arthur

Sri Lanka
Sri Lanka named their 15-man squad on 4 May 2009.

Coach: Trevor Bayliss

West Indies
West Indies named their 15-man squad on 9 May 2009.

Coach: John Dyson

Scotland
In July 2008 Zimbabwe, under pressure from South Africa and England over political matters related to Robert Mugabe, pulled out of the tournament of their own volition, creating an additional (third) space for an associate nation. Scotland won the third place playoff to qualify.

Team

Kyle Coetzer
Gavin Hamilton (c)
Neil McCallum
Navdeep Poonia
Fraser Watts
Ryan Watson
Majid Haq
Jan Stander
Craig Wright
Colin Smith (wk)
John Blain
Gordon Drummond
Richie Berrington
Glenn Rogers
Dewald Nel

References

2009 ICC World Twenty20
Cricket squads
ICC Men's T20 World Cup squads